Following are the official winners of the national Georgian Chess Championships from 1928 to date.  Until 1990 the Georgian Soviet Socialist Republic was a republic within the Soviet Union.

Winners

| valign="top" |
{| class="sortable wikitable"
! Nr !! Year !! Women's Winner
|-
|	1	||	1935	||	
|-
|	2	||	1936	||	
|-
|	3	||	1937	||	
|-
|	4	||	1938	||	
|-
|	5	||	1941	||	
|-
|	6	||	1941	||	
|-
|	7	||	1945	||	
|-
|	8	||	1947	||	
|-
|	9	||	1948	||	
|-
|	10	||	1950	||	
|-
|	11	||	1952	||	
|-
|	12	||	1953	||	
|-
|	13	||	1954	||	
|-
|	14	||	1955	||	
|-
|	15	||	1956	||	
|-
|	16	||	1957	||	
|-
|	17	||	1958	||	
|-
|	18	||	1959	||	
|-
|	19	||	1960	||	
|-
|	20	||	1961	||	
|-
|	21	||	1963	||	
|-
|	22	||	1964	||	
|-
|	23	||	1965	||	
|-
|	24	||	1966	||	
|-
|	25	||	1968	||	
|-
|	26	||	1969	||	
|-
|	27	||	1970	||	
|-
|	28	||	1971	||	
|-
|	29	||	1972	||	
|-
|	30	||	1973	||	
|-
|	31	||	1974	||	
|-
|	32	||	1975	||	
|-
|	33	||	1976	||	
|-
|	34	||	1977	||	
|-
|	35	||	1978	||	
|-
|	36	||	1979	||	
|-
|	37	||	1980	||	
|-
|	38	||	1981	||	
|-
|	39	||	1982	||	
|-
|	40	||	1983	||	
|-
|	41	||	1984	||	
|-
|	42	||	1985	||	
|-
|	43	||	1986	||	   
|-
|	44	||	1987	||	
|-
|	45	||	1988	||	
|-
|	46	||	1989	||	
|-
|	47	||	1990	||	
|-
|	48	||	1991	||	
|-
|	49	||	1992	||	
|-
|	50	||	1993	||	
|-
|	51	||	1994	||	
|-
|	52	||	1995	||	
|-
|	53	||	1996	||	
|-
|	54	||	1997	||	
|-
|	55	||	1998	||	
|-
|	56	||	1999	||	
|-
|	57	||	2000	||	   
|-
|	58	||	2001	||	
|-
|	59	||	2002	||	, Ana Matnadze
|-
|	60	||	2003	||	
|-
|	61	||	2004	||	
|-
|	62	||	2005	||	
|-
|	63	||	2006	||	
|-
|	64	||	2007	||	, Sopiko Khukhashvili 
|-
|       65      ||      2008    ||      , Salome Melia
|-
|       66      ||      2009    ||      
|-
|       67      ||      2010    ||      
|-
|       68      ||      2011    ||      
|-
|       69      ||      2012    ||      
|-
|       70      ||      2013    ||      
|-
|       71      ||      2014    ||      
|-
|       72      ||      2015    ||       
|-
|       73      ||      2016    ||     
|-
|       74      ||      2017    ||      
|-
|       75      ||      2018    ||      
|-
|       76      ||      2019    ||      
|-
|       77      ||      2020    ||      
|-
|       78      ||      2021    ||      
|-
|       79      ||      2022    ||      
|}
|}

References

List of winners 1928-2008
RUSBASE (part V) 1919-1937,1991-1994
RUSBASE (part IV) 1938-1960
RUSBASE (part III), 1961-1969,1985-1990
RUSBASE (part II) 1970-1984

Chess national championships
Women's chess national championships
Championship